Higher Tolcarne is a hamlet in Cornwall, England]. It is near St Mawgan; Tolcarne was one of the two Cornish manors of this name recorded in the Domesday Book, 1086. It is in the civil parish of Mawgan in Pydar

References

Hamlets in Cornwall
Manors in Cornwall